Paul DeMayo (September 12, 1967 – June 2, 2005) was an American IFBB professional bodybuilder.

Biography
Paul DeMayo was nicknamed "Quadzilla" for the size of his quadriceps. Born and raised in Malden, Massachusetts, United States, DeMayo first competed in bodybuilding when he placed 1st in the Teenage Massachusetts State championships. His first National Physique Committee (NPC) event was in 1988, where he took 7th place in the NPC Junior USA heavyweight class. He took 1st place in the NPC Nationals Championship event in 1994. His only Mr. Olympia was in 1995, when he placed 12th. DeMayo appeared in many fitness and magazine articles, including being featured on the cover of Iron Man.

Death
DeMayo died on June 2, 2005. in Boston from a heroin overdose. According to people close to him, DeMayo's problems started when his wife left him and he returned to Boston after he moved to California with her to train in Gold's Gym. He then was signed to an endorsement contract by sports nutritional supplement company Met-Rx and forced to compete in the 1995 Mr. Olympia against his wishes. He placed 12th and retired shortly afterwards.

DeMayo spent two years in the Billerica House of Correction (Middlesex County Jail) for shooting his gun in the air after an argument with his girlfriend and possession of percodan. Some months before his death he told friends he was working at Gold's Gym on Lansdowne Street in Boston, but it was revealed later that he was fired several months earlier due to a substance abuse problem.

Contest history
 1988 NPC Junior USA HeavyWeight - 7th
 1989 NPC Junior Nationals HeavyWeight - 4th
 1990 NPC Junior Nationals HeavyWeight - 3rd
 1991 NPC Junior Nationals Heavyweight - 1st & Overall Winner
 1991 NPC HeavyWeight - 3rd
 1992 NPC Nationals HeavyWeight - 4th
 1993 NPC USA Championships HeavyWeight - 3rd
 1994 NPC Nationals Heavyweight - 1st & Overall Winner
 1995 Mr. Olympia - 12th
 1995 IFBB Grand Prix England - 10th
 1995 IFBB Grand Prix Germany - 9th
 1995 IFBB Grand Prix Spain - 9th

References

1967 births
2005 deaths
American bodybuilders
Professional bodybuilders
Deaths by heroin overdose in Massachusetts